John Webber "Jerry" Turner (born January 17, 1954) is a retired American professional baseball player, an outfielder who played in seven full seasons and parts of three others in the Major Leagues from 1974–1983, mostly with the San Diego Padres (1974–1981; 1983).

Biography
Turner was born on January 17, 1954, in Texarkana, Arkansas. He grew up in Los Angeles, attended Venice High School, and was selected by the Padres with their tenth pick in the 1972 Major League Baseball draft.

Turner was first called to the Majors in September 1974 after he batted .326 with 18 home runs, 68 runs batted in and 154 hits for the Double-A Alexandria Aces. The following season, he had another late season trial after batting .329 with 91 RBI for the Triple-A Hawaii Islanders.

In 733 MLB games, Turner had a .257 batting average with 448 hits, 222 runs, 238 RBIs, 73 doubles, nine triples, and 45 home runs.

References

External links

1954 births
Living people
African-American baseball players
Alexandria Aces players
Baseball players from Arkansas
Baseball players from Los Angeles
Chicago White Sox players
Detroit Tigers players
Hawaii Islanders players
Las Vegas Stars (baseball) players
Major League Baseball outfielders
Portland Beavers players
San Diego Padres players
Tri-City Padres players
Venice High School (Los Angeles) alumni